The three Polonaises, Op. 71 were composed by Frédéric Chopin in his earlier days.

After the death of the composer, Julian Fontana had made up their summaries and publications. These works were published in 1855, and are now often designated as Nos. 8, 9 & 10 in the order below, continuing the numbering system followed by the seven polonaises published during the composer's lifetime.

Music 

 Allegro maestoso in D minor, WN 11 (1825-1827)
 Allegro moderato in B-flat major, WN 17 (1829)
 Allegro moderato in F minor, WN 12 (1826-1828)

Like most of Chopin's polonaises, they are in ternary form.

References

External links 
 

Polonaises by Frédéric Chopin
1825 compositions
1828 compositions
Compositions by Frédéric Chopin published posthumously
Polonaises